Nadil (also, Nadel’ and Nadjl) is a village and municipality in the Goygol Rayon of Azerbaijan.  It has a population of 1,032.

References 

Populated places in Goygol District